Jan Paulsen (born 12 February 1967) is a retired badminton player from Denmark.

Paulsen competed in badminton at the 1992 Summer Olympics in men's doubles with Henrik Svarrer. They lost in the quarterfinals to Li Yongbo and Tian Bingyi, of China, 15-11, 12-15, 17-14.

Achievements

IBF World Grand Prix 
The World Badminton Grand Prix sanctioned by International Badminton Federation (IBF) from 1983 to 2006.

Men's doubles

References

External links
 
 
 
 

1967 births
Living people
Danish male badminton players
Olympic badminton players of Denmark
Badminton players at the 1992 Summer Olympics